Morgan Fleet Simmons (May 21, 1924 - November 18, 1983) is a former Fijian cricketer. Simmons was a right-arm fast-medium bowler.

Simmons made his first-class debut for Fiji in 1954 against Otago during Fiji's 1953/54 tour of New Zealand. During the tour he played three further first-class matches, with his final first-class match for Fiji coming against Auckland.

In his 4 first-class matches for Fiji he scored 44 runs at a batting average of 14.66, with a high score of 16. With the ball he took 4 wickets at a bowling average of 76.00, with best figures of 1/42. In the field Simmons took a single catch.

Simmons also represented Fiji in 9 non first-class matches in their 1953/54 tour.

References

External links
Morgan Simmons at Cricinfo
Morgan Simmons at CricketArchive

1924 births
1983 deaths
People from Labasa
Fijian cricketers